HMS Aylmer  was a  of the Royal Navy that served during World War II.

Its commanding officers were Lt Cdr A.D.P. Campbell RN and Cdr B.W. Taylor RN (Senior Officer 5th Escort Group) on 30 August 1944 and Lt Cdr W.L. Smith RNR in February 1945.

HMS Aylmer was adopted by the Boy's Own Paper. In the May 1946 issue, C.J. Olivant (the author of the article) described the war service of HMS Aylmer.

She was stationed in Belfast for the duration of her wartime service with the 5th Escort Group.

Actions
HMS Aylmer served exclusively with the 5th Escort Group, taking part in operations in the North Atlantic in May 1944, off Normandy (Operation Neptune) in June 1944, and in the Barents Sea in Operation Goodwood in August 1944. It also served in the Mediterranean, escorting a convoy to Naples in September 1944.

During this operation HMS Nabob was torpedoed and ten minutes later the destroyer escort  (commanded by Cdr Donald MacIntyre, senior officer of the 5th Escort Group) was also hit by an acoustic torpedo (Gnat); both attacks were by the submarine . HMS Nabob was able to raise steam and was escorted back (at an average ) to Rosyth where she was considered a constructive total loss and used as spare parts. As a result of this action, Cdr Donald MacIntyre transferred his command to HMS Aylmer.

U-1051 was forced to the surface by the use of depth charges, then a gun battle ensued with U-1051 finally sinking after it had been rammed by HMS Aylmer. This action resulted in the loss of all hands (47) from the crew of U-1051. It is entirely clear that the ramming of U-1051 by HMS Aylmer was intentional and that Cdr B.W.Taylor was not removed from command, as has been suggested, shortly after this incident. A reading of the after-action report makes it clear that the U-1051 was still a belligerent submarine (during the attack by the escorts, U-1051 fired another torpedo at HMS Aylmer). When she surfaced, U-1051 was fired on by HMS Aylmer, HMS Calder, HMS Bligh and HMS Bentinck. It is known that the 3-inch/50 caliber main gun of the Captain class had trouble penetrating the hull plating of German submarines (their shells would bounce off the submarines they fired on), so it is possible Commander Taylor thought that discretion was the better option and rammed the submarine as the ship's "Elephant Guns" had little effect; however in doing this he would have been acting against Admiralty orders that ships were not to ram submarines except in dire circumstances.

The 46-page report in ADM 217/752 held in The National Archives completely vindicates Commander Taylor. At paragraph 8 of the Staff minute written by Captain J.T. Borrett, Captain (D) Belfast and attached to the proceedings of HMS Grindall says:

 It is noted that on surfacing no immediate attempt to evacuate the U-boat was observed. The only damage to be seen was to the conning tower, which if resulting from the Hedgehog attack, could not have been considered lethal. It is thought quite possible that the U-boat surfaced through faulty trim resulting from confusion in the boat caused by the Hedgehog explosion. From experience decisive results from 3-inch gunfire against the U-boat's hull could not be expected and the U-boat might well have regained control and dived again with a possibility of escape. Added to this HMS Calder was in imminent danger from torpedo attack. Having regard to these circumstances, it is considered that the decision made by the commanding officer of HMS Aylmer to ram was entirely correct and its execution was faultless.

The Staff Minute is initialled J.T.B. and dated 16/2 (1945) and it was approved by a more senior officer as App Excellent on 17/2.

On arrival at 11:30 that evening, HMS Tyler was sent back to sea to continue operations and Commander Taylor transferred his flag to HMS Bligh before also going back into the Irish Sea to continue operations with the 5EG. In the space of three days, the 5th Escort Group had sunk two U-boats.

Commander Taylor was subsequently Gazetted with the award of the Distinguished Service Cross on 29 May 1945, as was Commander Playne from HMS Calder.

Another theory that has been put forward is that in the noise and confusion of the gun battle the coxswain misheard orders and put the helm over the wrong way. However, published in The Battle of the Irish Sea, Sir David Gibson has included a picture of HMS Aylmer steaming in to ram the U-boat. She still has plenty of sea room and it looks as if the U-boat is underway. The photo was taken by one of Aylmers officers, Sub Lieutenant G.I. Davis R.N.V.R.

As Holyhead was too small to repair the damage to Aylmers bows, she made her way to Liverpool where she was repaired.

On 8 May 1945, VE day, HMS Aylmer  was in Belfast, her home port. On 10 May 1945, she was dispatched to Loch Alsh to assist in taking German U-boat crews into captivity. On 5 November 1945, she was returned to the US Navy at New York.

General informationPennant (UK): K 463Pennant (US)''': DE 72

References

 The Captain Class Frigates in the Second World War by Donald Collingwood. published by Leo Cooper (1998), .
 The Buckley-Class Destroyer Escorts by Bruce Hampton Franklin, published by Chatham Publishing (1999), .
 German U-Boat Losses During World War II by Axel Niestle, published by United States Naval Institute (1998), .
 Battle in the Irish Sea  by Sir David Gibson Bt. published by Maritime Books, Liskeard Cornwall (1993), .
 ADM 217/752 H.M.S. Grindall. Report of Proceedings, 18th/30 January 1945. Held at National Archives of United Kingdom.
 ''The London Gazette of Friday 25 May 1945, Third Supplement published 29 May 1945, number 37098.

External links
 uboat.net page for HMS Aylmer
 uboat.net page for U-765
 uboat.net page for U-1051
 captainclassfrigates.co.uk
 Photo gallery at Navsource.org

Captain-class frigates
Buckley-class destroyer escorts
World War II frigates of the United Kingdom
Ships built in Hingham, Massachusetts
1943 ships